Internal clock  may refer to:

 Circadian clock, a biochemical mechanism that oscillates with a period of 24 hours (in accordance with the day-night cycle); driver of the circadian rhythm
 de Broglie internal clock, hypothetical clock in an electron, constituting part of the mechanism by which a pilot wave guides a particle
 Electronic oscillator, an electronic circuit that produces a periodic, oscillating signal, often a sine wave or a square wave

See also
 Clock rate, the frequency of an electronic oscillator (such as an oscillator crystal) used by computer processor
 Proper time, the elapsed time between two events as measured by a clock that passes through both events